Philipp Lengsfeld (born 21 March 1972) is a German politician (CDU).

Life 

Born in East Berlin, Phillip Lengsfeld is the oldest son of German politician and civil rights activist Vera Lengsfeld. He grew up in the German Democratic Republic. In 2001, he joined the center-right CDU.

From 2013 to 2017, he was a member of the Bundestag.

Positions 

Philipp Lengsfeld belongs to the right-wing of his party, the so-called Berliner Kreis.

He opposes same-sex marriage and is critic of Angela Merkels climate policy.

References 

Living people
1972 births
Members of the Bundestag for Berlin
Technical University of Berlin alumni
People from East Berlin
Members of the Bundestag 2013–2017
Members of the Bundestag for the Christian Democratic Union of Germany